The National Institute of Family and Life Advocates (NIFLA) is an American 501(c)(3) charitable organization that is a member of the National Pro-Life Religious Council. Founded in 1993, it is based in Fredericksburg, Virginia and has the aim of "developing a network of life-affirming ministries in every community across the nation in order to achieve an abortion-free America." The organization provides legal advice to over 1,350 crisis pregnancy centers (CPCs) within its membership network, and the bulk of CPCs in the US are affiliated with NIFLA, Care Net and Heartbeat International. The organization's 2009 IRS Form 990 stated that the group spent $759,259 in annual advocacy expenses.

In 2004, Focus on the Family started the Option Ultrasound Program, which along with NIFLA, funds medical consultants to obtain ultrasound machines for crisis pregnancy centers and converts them to medical-style clinics. 1,000 of their members are medical clinics that utilize ultrasounds. Hundreds of CPCs have become medical clinics through NIFLA's Life Choice Project, which increases the number of women going to the clinics, including those described by the organization as "abortion-minded."

Its founder and president is Thomas Glessner. NIFLA provides legal counsel to CPCs as well as medical training, having trained over 2,500 nurses in ultrasound use. NIFLA publishes two monthly newsletters aimed at CPCs, Legal Tips and "Clinic Tips" as well as a quarterly publication, The Life Sentinel.  NIFLA also works with an insurance company that secures insurance for CPCs.

See also
Care Net
Heartbeat International
Pharmacists for Life International

References

External links

NIFLA's Institute in Limited Obstetrical Ultrasound

Anti-abortion organizations in the United States
501(c)(3) organizations
Crisis pregnancy centers